Stipančević is a Croatian surname, a patronymic of Stipan. Notable people with the surname include:

Maja Stipančević (born 1994), Croatian footballer, sister of Valentina
Valentina Stipančević (born 1992), Croatian footballer

See also
 Stipanović
 Stipanić

Croatian surnames